Ushan Manohara (full name Petta Yaddehi Ushan Manohara; born 26 August 1989) is a Sri Lankan cricketer. He is a right-handed batsman and right-arm medium-fast bowler who plays for Sinhalese Sports Club. He was born in Galle.

Manohara, who made his debut for Sinhalese Sports Club Under-23s during 2009, made his List A debut during the Premier Limited Overs Tournament competition of 2009–10, debuting against Colombo Cricket Club, taking a single wicket, that of fellow debutante Dilesh Gunaratne, for a second-ball duck.

Manohara made his first-class debut during the 2009-10 Premier Championship, against Sinhalese Sports Club, though he did not bat in the match, as two days were washed out.

External links
Ushan Manohara at Cricket Archive 

1989 births
Living people
Sri Lankan cricketers
Sinhalese Sports Club cricketers
Cricketers from Galle